Grant Revon Underwood is a historian of the Church of Jesus Christ of Latter-day Saints (LDS Church) and a professor at Brigham Young University (BYU).  He is also the author of The Millennial World of Early Mormonism and the editor of Voyages of Faith: Explorations in Mormon Pacific History.

Background
Underwood was born in Glendale, California and raised in Anaheim, California.  He served as a missionary for the LDS Church in Argentina from 1973 to 1975.

Underwood and his wife, the former Sheree Jolley, are the parents of seven children.  In the LDS Church he has served in several callings, including twice as a bishop.

Career
Underwood received his B.A. in 1977 and M.A. in 1981, both in history, from BYU.  He received his Ph.D. in history from the University of California at Los Angeles (UCLA) in 1988.  His advisor was Daniel Walker Howe.

During his BYU graduate studies, Underwood worked as an LDS Seminary teacher at Thunderbird High School in Phoenix, Arizona from 1977 to 1981.  While studying at UCLA, he taught at the LDS Institute of Religion in Los Angeles (1981–86), and later became Director of the Institute in Pomona, California (1986–92).  He was then a religion professor at Brigham Young University–Hawaii from 1992 to 1999, where he was elected Teacher of the Year multiple times.  In 2000 he joined the faculty of BYU in Provo, Utah as a professor of history and Research Historian with the Joseph Fielding Smith Institute for Latter-day Saint History.  In 2009 Underwood was on leave from BYU and working on the Joseph Smith Papers Project.

Underwood has been active in the Mormon History Association, serving on its Council from 1987 to 1990 and on the Board of Editors for the Journal of Mormon History from 1984 to 1987.  In Hawaii, he was active in the Mormon Pacific Historical Society and served on its board of directors.  In 2007 Underwood created a Mormon studies unit for the American Academy of Religion and served as co-chair.

Having background in Hawaii and Pacific Mormon history, Underwood is a Tour Director for the Hawaiian excursion from the company LDS Travel Study.

Honors
 T. Edgar Lyon Best Article from the Mormon History Association in 1986
 William Grover and Winnifred Foster Reese Award from the Mormon History Association in 1989
 T. Edgar Lyon Best Article from the Mormon History Association in 1989
The Millenarian World of Early Mormonism
 Best Book Award from the Mormon History Association in 1993
 Best Book Award from the John Whitmer Historical Association
 Nominated for the Philip Schaff Prize from the American Society of Church History
 Nominated for the Merle Curti Prize from the Organization of American Historians

Publications
Underwood has also written several articles on a broad variety of topics related to the history of the LDS Church, especially related to the doctrinal views of the LDS Church and its members in the nineteenth century.  He has also written Mormon history book reviews for academic journals.

The following is a list of some of Underwood's publications:

Books

  Paperback edition issued in 1999.

Articles

Papers

.
.
.

Notes

Sources
confetti books entry
Joseph Smith Papers editor bio
Claremont Mormon Studies association mention of participation

External links 
 

1954 births
Living people
Writers from Glendale, California
20th-century Mormon missionaries
American Latter Day Saint writers
Brigham Young University alumni
Brigham Young University faculty
Brigham Young University–Hawaii faculty
Church Educational System instructors
Historians of the Latter Day Saint movement
American Mormon missionaries in Argentina
People from Anaheim, California
University of California, Los Angeles alumni
American leaders of the Church of Jesus Christ of Latter-day Saints
Latter Day Saints from California
Latter Day Saints from Arizona
Latter Day Saints from Hawaii
Latter Day Saints from Utah